Perfluorocyclohexane or dodecafluorocyclohexane is a chemical which belongs to the class of fluorocarbons, sometimes referred to as perfluorocarbons or PFCs. Fluorocarbons and their derivatives are useful fluoropolymers, refrigerants, solvents, and anesthetics.

Synthesis
Perfluorocyclohexane can be synthesized by fluorination of cyclohexane.

Properties
Perfluorocyclohexane is chemically inert and thermally stable. It is a relatively non-toxic, clear, waxy solid, which has a high vapor pressure and therefore sublimes readily at room temperature. 
In common with other cyclic perfluorocarbons, perfluoromethylcyclohexane can be detected at extremely low concentrations, making it ideal as a tracer.
The molecule predominantly exists in its chair conformation, in which it possesses D3d molecular symmetry.

References 

Fluorocarbons
Halogenated solvents
Coolants